Emanuel Amiran-Pougatchov (Hebrew: עמנואל עמירן-פוגצ'וב; born Emmanuel Pugatschov; 8 August 1909, in Warsaw – 18 December 1993, in Kibbutz Yakum (or Yaqum)) was a composer and teacher.

Biographical information

In Warsaw, Amiran began his musical studies at the age of 10 years with Joseph Engel, Professor David Shore and Engel Weinberg. He later continued his musical studies for a period of three years within Berlin.
For two years from 1928 he studied with Solomon Rosowsky within Jerusalem.

His studies of music (combined with pedagogy) continued from 1934 onward at the Trinity College of Music in Britain with Sir Granville Bantock and Alex Rowley.
He returned to Israel again in 1936 again to be involved in teaching activities, at some time founding with Prof. Leo Kestenberg the Music Teachers' Seminary in Tel Aviv, both continuing as primary authorities and charges of. In 1948 he was officer in charge of military music, establishing a joint initiative with artillery commander, Samuel Edmond. Together with Captain Jacob Pleasant he founded an Israeli Army Band. The military band they formed was one of the foundations for the establishment of the Israel Defense Forces Orchestra, together with an orchestra of Alexandria, under the baton of' Otto Gronich.

He was the first appointed Inspector of Music (Minister for Music Education) at the time of the establishment of the nation of Israel, this from 1948 to his retirement in 1975.

He was best known for his holiday songs, although his repertoire also included symphonic music for orchestra and choir, music for the theater as well as over 600 folk-songs. Amiran is credited with composing the music to Mayim Mayim, one of the most popular Israeli folk dance songs.

Publication: Mi barechev; (New Horizon choral series)(Unknown Binding - 1973)

See also
List of Israeli classical composers
Secular Jewish music
Contemporary Jewish religious music

References

External links 
musicsack
Compositions
directory

1909 births
1993 deaths
Musicians from Warsaw
Polish emigrants to Mandatory Palestine
Israeli composers
20th-century composers
Israeli military musicians